Tomb TT174 is in El-Khokha, located in the Theban Necropolis in Thebes, Upper Egypt. It is the sepulchre of Ashakhet, who was a priest in front of Mut. The tomb dates to the 19th Dynasty.

Ashakhet and his wife Tadjabu are depicted at a family banquet in the hall of the tomb. Their son Pakhihet (TT187) is shown offering to his parents.

See also
 List of Theban tombs

References

Buildings and structures completed in the 13th century BC
Nineteenth Dynasty of Egypt
Theban tombs